Theo Lewis Weeks (born 19 January 1990) is a Liberian international footballer who plays as a midfielder for Omonia Aradippou.

Club career
On 14 June 2016, Weeks signed a year-long loan deal with Azerbaijan Premier League side Gabala FK.

On 3 January 2018, Weeks signed for Lebanese Premier League club Ansar on a six-month contract. He was the first and only Liberian player to appear for Ansar in the Lebanese Premier League

Karmiotissa FC announced on 20 June 2019, that Lewis had joined the club. He then moved to Cypriot Second Division club Omonia Aradippou in January 2020.

Career statistics

Club

International

Statistics accurate as of match played 4 September 2016

International goals

References

External links 
 
 
 Turkish Football Federation profile

1990 births
Living people
People from Montserrado County
Liberian footballers
Liberia international footballers
Liberian expatriate footballers
Association football midfielders
Ankaraspor footballers
MKE Ankaragücü footballers
Çaykur Rizespor footballers
Göztepe S.K. footballers
C.S. Marítimo players
Ermis Aradippou FC players
Karmiotissa FC players
Gabala FC players
Al Ansar FC players
Alki Oroklini players
Omonia Aradippou players
Süper Lig players
TFF First League players
Primeira Liga players
Liga Portugal 2 players
Cypriot First Division players
Cypriot Second Division players
Azerbaijan Premier League players
Lebanese Premier League players
Liberian expatriate sportspeople in Turkey
Liberian expatriate sportspeople in Azerbaijan
Liberian expatriate sportspeople in Lebanon
Liberian expatriate sportspeople in Oman
Expatriate footballers in Turkey
Expatriate footballers in Portugal
Expatriate footballers in Cyprus
Expatriate footballers in Azerbaijan
Expatriate footballers in Lebanon
Expatriate footballers in Oman